Cindrić is a Croatian surname. It is the most common surname in the Karlovac County.

It may refer to:

 Ann Cindric (1922–2010), Croatian-American baseball player
 Austin Cindric (born 1998), American race car driver
 Luka Cindrić (born 1993), Croatian handball player
 Slavin Cindrić (1901–1942), Romanian-born Croatian footballer who played for Yugoslavia
 Tim Cindric (born 1968), American race car driver

References

Croatian surnames